Sardar Raghbir Singh Panjhazari (1914-1999) was an Indian politician. He was a Member of Parliament, representing Punjab in the Rajya Sabha the upper house of India's Parliament as a member of the Indian National Congress.

References

Rajya Sabha members from Punjab, India
Indian National Congress politicians
1914 births
1999 deaths